Keshav Rao Sadashiv Rao Shastri Musalgaonkar is an Indian educationalist and Sanskrit scholar known for writing book of two thousand page at the age of 90.

Personal life 
He was born on 30 January 1928 in Gwalior. He is son of Mahamahopadhyay Sadasivashastri. He is married to Pramila Musalgaonkar.

Career 
He has done MA. in Sanskrit and M. A. in Hindi from University of Allahabad and holds Doctor of Philosophy. He has been served as a teacher. He retired on January 26, 2013 after 41 years of working.

Awards and Honors

Awards 
 Kalidas Samman in 2012-2013 
 Padma Shri in 2018 
 President's Award in 2008 
 Vishwa Bharti Award in 2017

Honors 
 Congratulated by Shivraj Singh Chouhan, Chief Minister Of Madhya Pradesh on February 11, 2018 
 Certificate of Honor by President of India 
 Student of Vikram University is doing Doctor of Philosophy on his writing work. 
 His written books are in courses of Vikram University and Bastar Vishwavidyalaya.

References 

Sanskrit scholars
1928 births
People from Gwalior
University of Allahabad alumni
Recipients of Kalidas Samman
Recipients of the Padma Shri in literature & education